Steller's sculpin (Myoxocephalus stelleri), also known as frog sculpin, is a species of marine ray-finned fish belonging to the family Cottidae, the typical sculpins.  This species is found in the northern Pacific, from the Aleutian Islands to the Sea of Okhotsk and the Sea of Japan. Described by Wilhelm Gottlieb Tilesius von Tilenau in 1811, it is the type species of the genus Myoxocephalus.

References

External links
 Frog Sculpin (Myoxocephalus stelleri ) at the Encyclopedia of Life

stelleri

Fish of the Pacific Ocean
Fish of Russia
Fish of Japan
Taxa named by Wilhelm Gottlieb Tilesius von Tilenau
Fish described in 1811
Fauna of the Aleutian Islands